The following are the First, Second, and Third Team selections by the Associated Press.

First team
Maya Moore, Connecticut, 6-0, Junior
Tina Charles, Connecticut, 6-4, Senior
Kelsey Griffin, Nebraska, 6-2, Senior
Monica Wright, Virginia, 5-11, Senior
Jantel Lavender, Ohio State, 6-4, Junior

Second Team
Andrea Riley, Oklahoma State, 5-5, Senior
Nnemkadi Ogwumike, Stanford, 6-2, Sophomore
Jayne Appel, Stanford, 6-4, Senior
Alysha Clark, Middle Tennessee, 5-10, Senior
Brittney Griner, Baylor, 6-8, Freshman

Third Team
Danielle Robinson, Oklahoma, 5-9, Junior
Jasmine Thomas, Duke, 5-9, Junior
Victoria Dunlap, Kentucky, 6-1, Junior
Elena Delle Donne, Delaware, 6-5, Freshman
Amber Harris, Xavier, 6-4, Junior

Honorable Mention
Danielle Adams, Texas A&M
Kachine Alexander, Iowa
Angie Bjorklund, Tennessee
Allyssa DeHaan, Michigan State
Skylar Diggins, Notre Dame
Dawn Evans, James Madison
Rachele Fitz, Marist
Tyra Grant, Penn State
Alexis Gray-Lawson, California
Kalana Greene, Connecticut
Allison Hightower, LSU
Alison Lacey, Iowa State
Judie Lomax, Columbia
Kevi Luper, Oral Roberts
Gabriela Marginiean, Drexel
Nicole Michael, Syracuse
Jacinta Monroe, Florida State
Kayla Pedersen, Stanford
Ta'Shia Phillips, Xavier
Samantha Prahalis, Ohio State
Chastity Reed, Arkansas-Little Rock
Sugar Rodgers, Georgetown
Lindsey Schraeder, Notre Dame
Tanisha Smith, Texas A&M.

References

All-Americans
NCAA Women's Basketball All-Americans